"Roma-Bangkok" ("From Rome to Bangkok") is a song recorded by Italian rapper Baby K, with vocals by Italian singer Giusy Ferreri, for her second studio album Kiss Kiss Bang Bang (2015). The song was released on 19 June 2015 as the second single from the album.

"Roma-Bangkok" was a massive commercial success in Italy in 2015. The song reached number one in a month on both the Italian FIMI chart and the EarOne airplay chart, becoming Baby K's first number-one single. It remained on the top of the chart for eleven consecutive weeks and later was certified diamond in Italy.

Background
The song was written by Federica Abbate, Rocco Hunt, Alessandro "Takagi" Merli and Fabio "Mr. Ketra" Clemente, the latter two also produced it. In an interview, Baby K presented the song with these words:
"The lyrics of this song present the geographical map of my life: London, Rome and the Far East. Actually, they are the places where I lived, which I still carry within myself and I can live again through my music".

Music video
The music video, directed by Mauro Russo, was published on 7 July 2015 on the rapper's official YouTube channel. It was acclaimed by critics, who noted its similarities to 1991 American film Thelma & Louise. However, MTV compared it to "Pretty Girls" music video by Britney Spears and Iggy Azalea. It was the first Italian music video to be Vevo certified; in February 2017, it became the all-time most watched Italian video on YouTube, with over 163 million views. Currently, the video has more than 280 million views.

Spanish version
On 17 February 2017 a second Spanish version was released featuring Argentine pop singer Lali. The song was adapted to Spanish by José Luis Pagan and was produced by Ketra & Takagi. Its music video was shot in September 2016 in Verona, Italy, and was directed by Gaetano Morbioli. Chiara Tomao from Optimagazine praised both artist's voices, writing "Lali's voice fits perfectly with our Claudia Nahum (Baby K)".

Charts

Weekly charts

Year-end charts

Certifications

Release history

References

External links
 

2015 singles
Italian songs
2015 songs
Giusy Ferreri songs
Number-one singles in Italy
Female vocal duets
Dancehall songs
Sony Music singles
2017 singles
Lali Espósito songs